Ivan Kanchev (22 December 1933 – 1 February 2013) was a Bulgarian footballer who played as a striker. He is legendary player of Lokomotiv Plovdiv and have 212 appearances and 73 goals in A PFG for the club. Ivan Kanchev is also "Sportsman №1 of Bulgaria" for 1968 and "Master of Sports" since 1969. He has played 16 games and has scored 6 goals in the UEFA Cup for Lokomotiv Plovdiv.

He has played in 3 games for the national team of Bulgaria.

References

1933 births
2013 deaths
Bulgarian footballers
Association football goalkeepers
PFC Lokomotiv Plovdiv players
First Professional Football League (Bulgaria) players